The 1977 Central Michigan Chippewas football team was an American football team that represented Central Michigan University during the 1977 NCAA Division I football season. In their eleventh and final season under head coach Roy Kramer, the Chippewas compiled a 10–1 record, finished in second place in the Mid-American Conference, and outscored all opponents by a combined total of 317 to 155.

The team's statistical leaders were quarterback Ron Rummel with 638 passing yards, tailback Mose Rison with 1,241 rushing yards, and Wayne Schwalbach with 426 receiving yards. Rison received the team's most valuable player award.

Roy Kramer was the team's head coach. Herb Deromedi was the defensive coordinator. Dave Farris was the defensive line coach. Don Peddie was the offensive backs coach. Chris Allen was the offensive line coach. Jim Schulte was the defensive ends coach. Denny Swenson was the defensive secondary coach.

Schedule

References

Central Michigan
Central Michigan Chippewas football seasons
Central Michigan Chippewas football